The Moodring Tour is the second concert tour by American recording artist Mýa. The tour was launched in support of her third studio album, Moodring (2003).

Background
By 2001, Harrison had amassed nine Top 10 hits and sold six million albums worldwide. Released July 2003, Moodring, her third studio album garnered favorable reviews from music critics and opened to her biggest first week sales. Less than two months after its release, Moodring was certified gold by RIAA.

Critical reception
Kelefa Sanneh of the New York Times gave a mixed review for the concert and wrote, “As a singer, Mýa is a great dancer, and that’s nothing to be ashamed.” Commenting on her singing, Sanneh wrote, "O.K., her sense of pitch sometimes wandered, and it's clear that vocal improvisation isn't her strong suit." However, she noted “the music sounded best when the beats were loudest" and "her vigorous, loose-limbed movements are reflected in her music, which is sprightly, sexy and theatrical."

Opening Act
 Javier

Setlist
The following setlist was obtained from the concert held on October 24, 2003, at Dream in Washington, D.C.. It does not represent all concerts for the duration of the tour. 
"Case of the Ex"
"Ghetto Supastar (That Is What You Are)"
"Movin' On"
"Late"
"Ayo!"
"Lady Marmalade"
"The Best of Me"
"You"
"Fallen"
"All Night Long"
"No Sleep Tonight"
"It's All About Me"
"Free"
"Sophisticated Lady"
"My Love Is Like...Wo"

Tour dates

Festivals and other miscellaneous performances
This concert was a part of "The Big Fresno Fair"
This concert was a part of the "Southern California Fair"
This concert was a part of the "TSU Homecoming Concert"

References

2003 concert tours